

The Carmier Dupoy T.10 is a 1920s French single-seat high-wing monoplane aircraft designed by Pierre Carmier.

Specifications

References

1920s French aircraft
Single-engined tractor aircraft
Aircraft first flown in 1924